Bubliai (formerly) is a village in Kėdainiai district municipality, in Kaunas County, in central Lithuania. According to the 2011 census, the village had a population of 29 people. A small hydroelectric power plant is installed near Bubliai. The A8 highway passes nearby Bubliai.

At the beginning of the 20th century there was Bubliai manor and village.

Demography

References

Villages in Kaunas County
Kėdainiai District Municipality